Hangzhou Daily or Hangzhou Ribao is a Hangzhou-based Chinese daily newspaper and is one of the most circulated newspapers in the world.

References

External links
Hangzhou Daily Website

Chinese-language newspapers (Simplified Chinese)
Chinese Communist Party newspapers
Daily newspapers published in China
Mass media in Hangzhou